There are over 9,000 Grade I listed buildings in England. This page is a list of these buildings in the London Borough of Richmond upon Thames.

Buildings

Hampton Court Palace

|}

Royal Botanic Gardens, Kew

|}

Other

|}

See also
 Grade II* listed buildings in Richmond upon Thames

Notes

External links
 

 
Lists of Grade I listed buildings in London